This article details the geographical distribution of speakers of the Italian language, regardless of the legislative status within the countries where it is spoken. In addition to the Italian-speaking area in Europe, Italian-speaking minorities are present in few countries.

Statistics

Native and non-native speakers by country

Subnational territories

Unspecified

Europe 

Italian is an official language of Italy and San Marino and is spoken fluently by the majority of the countries' populations. Italian is also used in administration and official documents in Vatican City.

In central-east Europe Italian is first in Montenegro, second in Austria, Croatia, Slovenia, and Ukraine after English, and third in Hungary, Romania and Russia after English and German. But throughout the world, Italian is the fifth most taught foreign language, after English, French, German, and Spanish.

In the European Union statistics, Italian is spoken as a native language by 13% of the EU population, or 65 million people, mainly in Italy. In the EU, it is spoken as a second language by 3% of the EU population, or 14 million people. Among EU states, the percentage of people able to speak Italian well enough to have a conversation is 66% in Malta, 15% in Slovenia, 14% in Croatia, 8% in Austria, 5% in France and Luxembourg, and 4% in the former West Germany, Greece, Cyprus, and Romania.

Albania
In Albania, it is one of the most spoken languages. This is due to the strong historical ties between Italy and Albania but also the Albanian communities in Italy, and the 19,000 Italians living in Albania. It is reported as high as 70% of the Albanian adult population has some form of knowledge of Italian. Furthermore, the Albanian government has pushed to make Italian a compulsory second language in schools. Today, Italian is the third most spoken language in the country after Albanian and Greek.

The Italian language is well-known and studied in Albania, another non-EU member, due to its historical ties and geographical proximity to Italy and to the diffusion of Italian television in the country.

Croatia, Slovenia and Montenegro 
Italian formerly had official status in Montenegro (because of the Venetian Albania), and in parts of Slovenia and Croatia (because of the Venetian Istria and Venetian Dalmatia). Italian language in Slovenia is an officially recognized minority language in the country. The official census, carried out in 2002, reported 2,258 ethnic Italians (Istrian Italians) in Slovenia (0.11% of the total population). Italian language in Croatia is an official minority language in the country, with many schools and public announcements published in both languages. The 2001 census in Croatia reported 19,636 ethnic Italians (Istrian Italians and Dalmatian Italians) in the country (some 0.42% of the total population). Their numbers dropped dramatically after World War II following the Istrian–Dalmatian exodus, which caused the emigration of between 230,000 and 350,000 Istrian Italians and Dalmatian Italians. Italian was the official language of the Republic of Ragusa from 1492 to 1807.

France and Monaco
Italian is also spoken by a minority in Monaco and France, especially in the southeastern part of the country. Italian was the official language in Savoy and in Nice until 1860, when they were both annexed by France under the Treaty of Turin, a development that triggered the "Niçard exodus", or the emigration of a quarter of the Niçard Italians to Italy, and the Niçard Vespers. Italian was the official language of Corsica until 1859. Today it is estimated that only 10% of Corsica's population speak the language natively, with 50% having some sort of proficiency in it. Italian is generally understood in Corsica by the population resident therein who speak Corsican, which is an Italo-Romance idiom similar to Tuscan. Ligurian is recognized as a regional language in the French department of the Alpes-Maritimes, furthermore, there is an autochthonous Italian population dating from the Savoyard Kingdom of Sardinia, which controlled the area until 1860, the year the Treaty of Turin entered into force, regardless the more recent Italian immigrants of the twentieth century. Italian was the official language in Monaco until 1860, when it was replaced by the French. This was due to the annexation of the surrounding County of Nice to France following the Treaty of Turin (1860).

Greece 
Italian formerly had official status in parts of Greece (because of the Venetian rule in the Ionian Islands and by the Kingdom of Italy in the Dodecanese).

Malta
Italian is widely spoken in Malta, where nearly two-thirds of the population can speak it fluently. Italian served as Malta's official language until 1934, when it was abolished by the British colonial administration amid strong local opposition.

Switzerland
Italian is official, together with French, German and Romansch in Switzerland, with most of the 0.7 million speakers concentrated in the south of the country, in the cantons of Ticino and southern Graubünden (predominately in Italian Grigioni). Italian is the third most spoken language in Switzerland (after German and French), and its use has modestly declined since the 1970s.

Africa 
Due to heavy Italian influence during the Italian colonial period, Italian is still understood by some in former colonies. Outside former colonies, Italian is also understood and spoken in Tunisia and Egypt by a small part of the population.

Eritrea
In Eritrea, Italian is at times used in commerce and the capital city Asmara still has one Italian-language school. The official language of Eritrea, Tigrinya, has a number of words borrowed from Italian.

Libya
Although it was the primary language in Libya since colonial rule, Italian greatly declined under the rule of Muammar Gaddafi, who expelled the Italian Libyan population and made Arabic the sole official language of the country. Nevertheless, Italian continues to be used in economic sectors in Libya, and today it is the most spoken second language in the country.

Somalia
Italian was also introduced to Somalia through colonialism and was the sole official language of administration and education during the colonial period but fell out of use after government, educational and economic infrastructure were destroyed in the Somali Civil War. Italian is still understood by some elderly and other people. The official languages of the Somali Republic are Somali (Maay and Maxaatiri) and Arabic. The working languages during the Transitional Federal Government were Italian and English.

Ethiopia
Italian is still spoken by few parts of the Ethiopian population (mostly among older generations) despite the brief period under Italian rule when compared with the other colonies, and it is taught in many schools (most notably the Istituto Statale Italiano Omnicomprensivo di Addis Abeba). Also, Ethiopian languages such as Amharic and Tigrinya have some words borrowed from the Italian language.

Americas

Canada
In Canada, Italian is the second most spoken non-official language when varieties of Chinese are not grouped together, with over 660,000 speakers (or about 2.1% of the population) according to the 2006 Census.

Costa Rica
In Costa Rica, Central America, Italian is one of the most important immigration community languages, after English. It is spoken in the southern area of the country in cities like San Vito and other communities of Coto Brus, near the south borderline with Panama.

South America

Italian immigrants to South America have also brought a presence of the language to that continent. In Argentina about 63% of the population has Italian ancestry, and Italian is the second most spoken language after the official language of Spanish, with over 1 million (mainly of the older generation) speaking it at home. Italian has also influenced the dialect of Spanish spoken in Argentina and Uruguay, mostly in phonology, known as Rioplatense Spanish. Its impact can also be seen in the Portuguese prosody of the Brazilian state of São Paulo, which itself has 15 million Italian descendants.  Italian bilingual speakers can be found in the Southeast of Brazil as well as in the South. In Venezuela, Italian is the most spoken language after Spanish and Portuguese, with around 200,000 speakers. Smaller Italian-speaking minorities on the continent are also found in Paraguay and Ecuador.

Also, variants of regional languages of Italy are used. Examples include the Talian dialect in Brazil, where it is officially a historic patrimony of Rio Grande do Sul; the Chipilo Venetian dialect in Mexico; and Cocoliche and Lunfardo in Argentina, especially in Buenos Aires.

United States

Although over 17 million Americans are of Italian descent, only around 709,000 people in the United States spoke Italian at home in 2013. Nevertheless, an Italian language media market does exist in the country. On the other hand, although technology allows for the Italian language to spread globally, there has been a decrease in the number of Italian speakers in the home in the United States. According to the U.S. Census Bureau, the number of those speaking Italian at home in 1980 was 1,614,344. In 1990, those speaking Italian at home in the United States had dropped to 1,308,648. In 2000, the number of speakers decreased to 1,008,370, and finally, in 2010, it had plummeted to 725,223. The percent change from 1980 to 2010 was a negative 55.2.

In the United States, Italian is the fourth most taught foreign language after Spanish, French, and German, in that order (or the fifth if American Sign Language is considered).

Australia
In Australia, Italian is the second most spoken foreign language after Chinese, with 1.4% of the population speaking it as their home language. The Italo-Australian dialect came into note in the 1970s by Italian linguist Tullio De Mauro.

Notes

References

Italian distribution
Italian
 Distribution